Tina Louise Bomberry (c. 1966 – February 10, 2018) was an Aboriginal Canadian actress, who performed in film, television, and on stage. She was best known for her role as Rosie Deela in the series North of 60 and its three television films.

Career
A member of the Mohawk Nation, Bomberry trained as an actress at Toronto's Native Theatre School in 1986 and Ryerson University in 1988. Her first credited appearance was a minor role in the 1989 television film Where the Spirit Lives. She also appeared in the 1993 adaptation of the novel Medicine River. From 1992 to 1997, she portrayed Rosie Deela in North of 60 and its three follow-up films: In the Blue Ground
(1999), Another Country (2003), and Distant Drumming (2005).

In 1995, her work as Rosie was nominated for a Gemini Award for Best Performance by an Actress in a Supporting Role. She also performed with the De-ba-jeh-mu-jig Theatre Group.

Personal life
In June 2015, Bomberry was involved in a single-vehicle accident that injured her and a child traveling with her. Bomberry was admitted in serious condition into the intensive care unit at McMaster University Medical Centre in Hamilton, where she eventually recovered.

Bomberry died on February 10, 2018, aged 52, at her home on the Six Nations reserve in Ohsweken. The cause of death has not been disclosed.

Filmography

Film

Television

References

External links
 
 North of 60 interview (2002)

1960s births
Year of birth missing
2018 deaths
Canadian Mohawk people
Canadian film actresses
Canadian stage actresses
Canadian television actresses
First Nations actresses
Toronto Metropolitan University alumni